For Love, Only for Love is a 1993 Italian historical drama film directed by Giovanni Veronesi and starring Diego Abatantuono, Penélope Cruz and Alessandro Haber. It depicts the nativity of Mary.

Reception
The film did well in the run up to Christmas with a gross of over $3.5 million in Italy.

See also      
 List of Italian films of 1993

References

External links 
 

1993 films
1993 drama films
1990s Italian-language films
Films set in the 1st century BC
Portrayals of the Virgin Mary in film
Italian drama films
Films directed by Giovanni Veronesi
1990s Italian films